Louis Pierre Jean Aphrodise Cassan (23 April 1771 – 20 January 1852) became a French regiment and brigade commander during the Napoleonic Wars. In 1791 he joined a volunteer battalion as a captain. In 1794 he fought at Boulou during the War of the Pyrenees. After transferring to Italy, he served at Millesimo, Ceva, Lodi, Castiglione and Bassano in 1796. He fought at Messkirch, Biberach and Hohenlinden in 1800 and Porto Ferrajo in 1801. Cassan was appointed colonel of the 20th Line Infantry Regiment in 1803 and led it at Verona, Caldiero and Gaeta in 1805–1806. His promotion to general of brigade came through in 1811. He was later sent to Spain where he led the stubborn defense of Pamplona in 1813. After a period of inactive duty, he served during the French conquest of Algeria before retiring in 1833.

References

1771 births
1852 deaths
French generals
French military personnel of the French Revolutionary Wars
French military personnel of the Napoleonic Wars
People from Aude
Barons of the First French Empire
Commandeurs of the Légion d'honneur